William Shorma (born July 7, 1955) is an American politician. He serves as a Republican member of the South Dakota Senate, where he represents District 16 (encompassing parts of Lincoln County and Union County).

References

Living people
Republican Party South Dakota state senators
21st-century American politicians
1955 births